Men's quadruple sculls competition at the 2008 Summer Olympics in Beijing was held from August 10 to 17, at the Shunyi Olympic Rowing-Canoeing Park.

This rowing event is a quadruple scull event, meaning that each boat is propelled by four rowers. The "scull" portion means that each rower uses two oars, one on each side of the boat; this contrasts with sweep rowing in which each rower has one oar and rows on only one side.

The competition consisted of multiple rounds. Finals were held to determine the placing of each boat; these finals were given letters with those nearer to the beginning of the alphabet meaning a better ranking. Semifinals were named based on which finals they fed, with each semifinal having two possible finals.

During the first round three heats were held. The top three boats in each heat advanced to the A/B semifinals, with all others going to the repechage. In the repechage, four boats raced for three spots in the A/B semifinals, with the top three advancing and the fourth place boat getting an overall rank of 13th of 13 boats competing in the event.

Only A/B semifinals were held. For each of the two semifinal races, the top three boats moved on to the better of the two finals (the A final), while the bottom three boats went to the lesser of the two finals (the B final).

The third and final round was the Finals. Each final determined a set of rankings. The A final determined the medals, along with the rest of the places through 6th. The B final gave rankings from 7th to 12th.

Schedule
All times are China Standard Time (UTC+8)

Results

Heats
Qualification Rules: 1-3->SA/B, 4..->R

Heat 1

Heat 2

Heat 3

Repechage
Qualification Rules: 1-3->SA/B

Semifinals A/B
Qualification Rules: 1-3->FA, 4..->FB

Semifinal A/B 1

Semifinal A/B 2

Final B

Final A

Poland completed the perfect quadrennial with wins at the 2005, 2006, and 2007 World Championships before capturing Olympic gold in Beijing.

References

External links
NYT Olympic Report

Rowing at the 2008 Summer Olympics
Men's events at the 2008 Summer Olympics